is a trans-Neptunian object and possible dwarf planet orbiting in the scattered disc of the outermost Solar System. The discoverers have nicknamed it "DeeDee" for "Distant Dwarf".

 was discovered by a team led by David Gerdes using data collected by the large camera Dark Energy Camera (DECam). It has a diameter of ~ and reflects just 13 percent of the sunlight that hits it on its approximately 1,100 year orbit around the Sun.

See also 
 List of Solar System objects most distant from the Sun
 List of Solar System objects by greatest aphelion

References

External links 
 2014 UZ224 ("DeeDee") Fact Sheet
 
 

Minor planet object articles (unnumbered)

20140819